Niphadoses dengcaolites is a moth in the family Crambidae. It was described by Wang and Sung in 1978. It is found in China (Jiangsu, Hubei, Jiangxi, Hunan, Sichuan).

References

Moths described in 1978
Schoenobiinae